Ulan may refer to:

Places
Ulan, New South Wales, a town in Australia
Ulan County, in Qinghai Province, China
Ulan District, eastern Kazakhstan
Ulan, Iran, a village in Zanjan Province

People
Ulan, politician from Inner Mongolia, China

Military
Uhlan, Tatar-modelled light cavalry that formed part of the Polish, Russian, Prussian, and Austrian armies until the 20th century
ASCOD Ulan, a modern Austrian infantry fighting vehicle

Music
 "Ulan" (Rivermaya song), on the group's 1994 self-titled album
 "Ulan", a song by Filipino rock group Cueshé on their 2005 album Half Empty, Half Full

Other uses
 Ulan (cycling team), a 2008 Kazakh road-racing team
 Ulan (film), a 2019 Filipino film
 Oil of Ulan, the Australasian localisation used until the 1990s for the skin-cream product Olay
 Union List of Artist Names (ULAN), a controlled vocabulary maintained by the Getty Vocabulary Program
 Ulan, the player character of the 2021 video game Astria Ascending

See also
 Ulaan (disambiguation), Mongolian word for red
 Wulan (disambiguation)